Plagues & Pleasures on the Salton Sea is a documentary film by Chris Metzler and Jeff Springer, with narration by John Waters and music by Friends of Dean Martinez.

This often humorous documentary tells the story of the accidental lake and environmental catastrophe known as the Salton Sea, located in the desert of southern California in the United States.

Release
The film premiered at the 2004 Slamdance Film Festival. With the addition of John Waters as the film's narrator, the new version of the film premiered at the Provincetown International Film Festival, in Provincetown, Massachusetts, hosted by Mr. Waters himself. The film opened in select theaters on February 24, 2006 and continued to screen theatrically throughout the United States and Canada until late 2007.

A shorter, more environmentally themed version of the film aired on the Sundance Channel's GREEN programming block, along with occasional broadcasts on the PBS TV station KQED documentary series Truly, CA.

The DVD of Plagues & Pleasures on the Salton Sea was released by the home video distributor, Docurama/New Video, on September 25, 2007.

Critical reception
The Christian Science Monitor's lead film critic, Peter Rainer, gave Plagues & Pleasures on the Salton Sea an "A"
and called it a "One-of-a-kind documentary... A startlingly funny portrait of Gothic Americana." And the Baltimore Sun's Michael Sragow wrote "Because of Metzler and Springer's appetite for raw experience, what could have been a depressing horror movie is wildly funny and enraging. It's the rare documentary with something for everyone."

The review aggregator Rotten Tomatoes certified the film as "Fresh", reporting that 96% of critics gave the film positive reviews, based on 53 reviews. Metacritic reported the film had an average score of 72 out of 100, based on 8 reviews. In screening at more than 200 festivals in twenty countries, Plagues & Pleasures on the Salton Sea won 37 awards for Best Documentary.

See also
Bombay Beach, a 2011 documentary about the Salton Sea community of Bombay Beach, California
Salvation Mountain, a folk art structure built by Leonard Knight, who is interviewed in the film

References

External links

American documentary films

Documentary films about California
Documentary films about United States history
Documentary films about water and the environment
Films set in Palm Springs, California
Salton Sea
2004 documentary films
2004 films
2000s English-language films
2000s American films